Winson Green railway station was a railway station in Birmingham, England, built by the London and North Western Railway on their Stour Valley Line in 1876. It served the Winson Green area of Birmingham.

Showell's Dictionary of Birmingham, discussing railway accidents in the city, notes that:

but does not elaborate as to the circumstances.

The station closed in 1957, although the Rugby-Birmingham-Stafford Line loop from the West Coast Main Line still runs through the site of the station today.

There is some evidence of the station on the ground today, as the two tracks running currently through the site of the station split at the location of an island platform.

The station was not the only one to bear the name. Following the closure of Winson Green station, the nearby  station was renamed Winson Green in 1965. However it too was closed in 1972.

References

Photos by D J Norton: Winson Green Station
Class 25 Action
British History Online: Birmingham Communications

Further reading

Disused railway stations in Birmingham, West Midlands
Railway stations in Great Britain opened in 1876
Railway stations in Great Britain closed in 1957
Former London and North Western Railway stations